The 1996 Spanish Grand Prix was a Formula One motor race held on 2 June 1996 at the Circuit de Catalunya.

This race, Michael Schumacher's first Ferrari victory, is generally regarded as one of his finest. In the torrential rain, he produced a stunning drive, and is a prime example of why he earned the nickname "Regenmeister" ("Rainmaster"), despite his early and unforced crash at a wet Monaco Grand Prix two weeks earlier.

At the start, Schumacher lost several positions due to a clutch problem, which indirectly resulted in several clashes in the main straight involving 5 cars. Giancarlo Fisichella emerged from the carnage with a blown left front and a missing rear wing, while Olivier Panis escaped with suspension damage. Both pulled into the pits and retired a lap later.

Mika Salo was disqualified for the second time this season, for changing cars after the field was under starter's orders.

Damon Hill had started the race from pole position, but dropped to 8th after spinning twice in the opening laps, before another spin into the pit wall on lap 12 ended his race. Schumacher recovered from a poor start to take the lead from Villeneuve on lap 13, and from then on he dominated the race, lapping over three seconds a lap faster than the remainder of the field.

Rubens Barrichello was running a competitive race, getting as high as 2nd place after Jacques Villeneuve and Alesi made their pit stops. After his own scheduled (lengthy) pitstop he was sent back to the race but forced to retire from third place with 20 laps to go after a clutch problem caused his engine to fade out. On the previous lap, Gerhard Berger had spun his Benetton out of fourth place while trying to lap the Ligier of Pedro Diniz. Alesi and Villeneuve switched places on their own pitstops, Alesi taking his only one some 6 laps before Villeneuve.

After an uneventful race on his part, Heinz-Harald Frentzen finished in fourth, while Mika Häkkinen took fifth after surviving a spin off the track in the closing stages of the race. Jos Verstappen, running fifth after the retirements of Barrichello and Berger, crashed into the tyre barrier with 12 laps left, guaranteeing Diniz his first Formula One point as by this time only six drivers were left in the race. With no further retirements, Diniz brought his car home in sixth, after driving at a more cautious pace that saw him fall two laps adrift of the front runners by the end.

Classification

Qualifying

Race

Championship standings after the race

Drivers' Championship standings

Constructors' Championship standings

 Note: Only the top five positions are included for both sets of standings.

References

Spanish Grand Prix
Spanish Grand Prix
Grand Prix
Spanish Grand Prix